Richard Kapuš (born February 9, 1973) is a Slovak former professional ice hockey centre.

Career
Kapuš spent the majority of his career playing in the Slovak Extraliga for HC Slovan Bratislava. He also played in the Czech Extraliga for HC Oceláři Třinec, the Swedish Elitserien for Luleå HF and the Russian Superleague/Kontinental Hockey League for Avangard Omsk, HC Metallurg Novokuznetsk and HC Lada Togliatti.

He also played with the Slovak national ice hockey team in the 1998, 1999, 2000, 2003 and 2004 Men's Ice Hockey World Championships. He won the silver medal with Slovakia in 2000 championship and the bronze medal in the 2003 championship. He was also a member of the silver medal winning Slovakia national inline team competing in the 2008 Men's World Inline Hockey Championships.

Career statistics

Regular season and playoffs

International

External links

1973 births
Avangard Omsk players
HC '05 Banská Bystrica players
HC Berkut players
HC Slovan Bratislava players
Ice hockey players at the 2002 Winter Olympics
Ice hockey players at the 2006 Winter Olympics
Metallurg Novokuznetsk players
HC Lada Togliatti players
Living people
Luleå HF players
HC Oceláři Třinec players
Olympic ice hockey players of Slovakia
Ice hockey people from Bratislava
Slovak expatriate ice hockey players in Russia
Slovak ice hockey centres
Czechoslovak ice hockey centres
Slovak expatriate ice hockey players in the Czech Republic
Slovak expatriate ice hockey players in Sweden
Slovak expatriate sportspeople in Ukraine
Expatriate ice hockey players in Ukraine